Hristo Georgiev is a Bulgarian sprint canoer who competed in the late 1980s. He won a bronze medal in the C-4 1000 m event at the 1989 ICF Canoe Sprint World Championships in Plovdiv.

References

Bulgarian male canoeists
Living people
Year of birth missing (living people)
ICF Canoe Sprint World Championships medalists in Canadian